Brazilian language may refer to:

 Brazilian Portuguese, a set of dialects of the Portuguese language used mostly in Brazil and spoken by virtually all of the 200 million inhabitants of Brazil
 One of the other languages of Brazil